Bettina Scholl-Sabbatini (born 1942) is a Luxembourg sculptor, painter and ceramist. As a result of her participation in Soroptimist International Europa, where she served as vice-president from 2003 to 2005, she fostered an increasingly close relationship with Rwanda, where she has coordinated development projects following the Tutsi genocide. Her visits have also inspired her artistic designs. As a result, Rwanda exhibited her works at the 2010 Venice Biennale of Architecture.

Biography
Born in Esch-sur-Alzette on 19 December 1942, Bettina Sabbatini was the daughter of the sculptor Aurelio Sabbatini (1909–1987). She studied ceramic art and sculpture at the Istituto Statale d’Arte di Sesto Fiorentino in Florence, Italy, (1963–1967) and at the Académie de la Grande Chaumière in Paris where she studied under Jérome and Brayer. She works with bronze, stone and loam and also paints. She has created works for public spaces and for many churches and chapels, including those in the Luxembourg localities of Bascharage, Bertrange, Dudelange, Lellig and Merl. Her work has been exhibited in Belgium, Denmark, France, Germany, Italy, Japan, Luxembourg, Sénégal and Spain.

Awards
1987: Special prize from the Fonds Culturel National Luxembourgeois
1976: First Prize for Sculpture, Biennale des Jeunes, Luxembourg

References

External links
Bettina Scholl-Sabbatini on the Marion Vogt site

1942 births
Living people
People from Esch-sur-Alzette
21st-century Luxembourgian painters
Luxembourgian women artists
21st-century Luxembourgian sculptors
21st-century ceramists
Luxembourgian women painters
Luxembourgian women sculptors
Luxembourgian women ceramists
20th-century Luxembourgian painters
20th-century Luxembourgian sculptors
20th-century ceramists